Hatchet is a 1986 Newbery Honor-winning young-adult wilderness survival novel written by American writer Gary Paulsen. It is the first novel of five in the Hatchet series. Other novels in the series include The River (1991), Brian's Winter (1996), Brian's Return (1999) and Brian's Hunt (2003).

Plot
Brian Robeson is a thirteen-year-old son of divorced parents. As he travels from Hampton, New York on a single-engine Cessna bush plane to visit his father in the oil fields in Northern Canada for the summer, the pilot suffers a massive heart attack and dies. Brian tries to land the plane but ends up crash-landing into a lake in the forest. He must learn to survive on his own with nothing but his windbreaker and a hatchet—a gift his mother gave him shortly before his plane departed.

Throughout the summer, Brian learns how to survive in the vast wilderness with only his hatchet and a windbreaker. He discovers how to make fire with the hatchet and eats whatever food he can find, such as rabbits, birds, turtle eggs, fish, berries, and fruit. He deals with various threats of nature, including mosquitoes, a porcupine, bear, wolf, skunk, moose, and even a tornado. Over time, Brian develops his survival skills and becomes a fine woodsman. He crafts a bow, arrows, and a fishing spear to aid in his hunting. He also fashions a shelter out of the underside of a rock overhang. During his time alone, Brian struggles with memories of home and the bittersweet memory of his mother, whom Brian had caught cheating on his father before their divorce.

When a sudden tornado hits the area, it draws the tail of the plane toward the shore of the lake. This triggers his thoughts that there may be a survival pack of some sort on the plane. Brian makes a raft from a few broken-off treetops to get to the plane. When Brian is cutting his way into the tail of the plane, he drops his hatchet in the lake and dives in to get it. Once inside the plane, Brian finds a survival pack that includes additional food, an emergency transmitter, and a .22  AR-7 rifle. Back on shore, Brian activates the transmitter, but not knowing how to use it, he thinks it is broken and throws it aside. However, his distress call is heard by a passing airplane, and he is rescued. Brian spends the remainder of the summer with his father but does not disclose his mother's affair.

Sequel novels 
Paulsen continued the story of Brian Robeson with four more novels, beginning with The River in 1991.

Film adaptation
A film adaptation titled A Cry in the Wild was released in 1990.

Reception
Hatchet was a recipient of the 1988 Newbery Honor. In 2012 it was ranked number 23 on a list of the top 100 children's novels published by School Library Journal.

Bibliography

Notes

References

External links
 For the sequels, Brian's Saga in Gary Paulsen's website.
 For notes, 

1986 American novels
Novels by Gary Paulsen
Newbery Honor-winning works
American young adult novels
American novels adapted into films
Novels about survival skills
Novels set in Canada
1986 children's books
American adventure novels